The Billboard Hot 100 is a chart that ranks the best-performing singles of the United States. Published by Billboard magazine, the data are compiled by Nielsen SoundScan based collectively on each single's weekly physical sales and airplay. In 1998, there were 16 singles that topped the chart, in 52 issue dates.

During the year, 10 acts had achieved a first U.S. number-one single, namely: Savage Garden, Usher, Will Smith, Next, Brandy, Monica, Aerosmith, Barenaked Ladies, Lauryn Hill, and Divine. R&B singer Monica and pop singer Céline Dion both had two number-one singles in 1998.

Brandy and Monica's "The Boy Is Mine" is the longest-running single of the year, staying at number one for thirteen consecutive weeks. Other singles that had a multiple chart run includes Monica's "The First Night" with five weeks atop and Next's "Too Close", Aerosmith's "I Don't Want to Miss a Thing" and R. Kelly's  "I'm Your Angel" (featuring Céline Dion) with four weeks (the latter spending two additional weeks at number one in 1999).

Chart history

Number-one artists

See also
1998 in music
List of Billboard number-one singles

References

Additional sources
Fred Bronson's Billboard Book of Number 1 Hits, 5th Edition
Joel Whitburn's Top Pop Singles 1955-2008, 12 Edition
Joel Whitburn Presents the Billboard Hot 100 Charts: The Nineties
Additional information obtained can be verified within Billboard's online archive services and print editions of the magazine.

1998 record charts
1998